The Two-woman bobsleigh competition at the 2006 Winter Olympics in Turin, Italy was held on 20 and 21 February, at Cesana Pariol.

Records
While the IOC does not consider bobsled times eligible for Olympic records, the FIBT does maintain records for both the start and a complete run at each track it competes.

Prior to this competition, the existing Cesana Pariol track records were as follows.

The following track records were established during this event.

Results

15 of the 16 two-woman teams entered for the event completed all four runs, with the Netherlands-1 team of Broeders and Pennings the only team not to do so. The Dutch pair crashed on the first run, and, while neither was injured, they did not compete in subsequent runs.

The total time for all four runs was used to determine the final ranking. Sandra Kiriasis and Anja Schneiderheinze, the 2005 World Champions won gold by 0.71 seconds, having the fastest time in three of the four runs.

References

Bobsleigh at the 2006 Winter Olympics
Women's bobsleigh at the 2006 Winter Olympics
Women's events at the 2006 Winter Olympics
Bob